Ōtāhuhu / Mount Richmond is volcanic peak and Tūpuna Maunga (ancestral mountain) in the Auckland volcanic field. A group of scoria mounds up to 48 m high, it has two 50 m wide craters. It was the site of a pā, and retains some Māori earthworks from that time such as kumara pits and terracing.

In the 2014 Treaty of Waitangi settlement between the Crown and the Ngā Mana Whenua o Tāmaki Makaurau collective of 13 Auckland iwi and hapu (also known as the Tāmaki Collective), ownership of the 14 Tūpuna Maunga of Tāmaki Makaurau / Auckland, was vested to the collective, including the volcano officially named Ōtāhuhu / Mount Richmond. The legislation specified that the land be held in trust "for the common benefit of Ngā Mana Whenua o Tāmaki Makaurau and the other people of Auckland". The Tūpuna Maunga o Tāmaki Makaurau Authority or Tūpuna Maunga Authority (TMA) is the co-governance organisation established to administer the 14 Tūpuna Maunga. Auckland Council manages the Tūpuna Maunga under the direction of the TMA.

References

Further reading
City of Volcanoes: A geology of Auckland - Searle, Ernest J.; revised by Mayhill, R.D.; Longman Paul, 1981. First published 1964. .
Volcanoes of Auckland: The Essential guide - Hayward, B.W., Murdoch, G., Maitland, G.; Auckland University Press, 2011. .
Volcanoes of Auckland: A Field Guide. Hayward, B.W.; Auckland University Press, 2019, 335 pp. .

External links
Drawing of Mt Richmond in 1861.
Photographs of Mount Richmond held in Auckland Libraries' heritage collections.

Auckland volcanic field
Mountains of the Auckland Region